Marc Rebillet (born December 10, 1988) is a French-American electronic musician and YouTuber from Dallas, Texas, currently based in New York City. Known for his improvised funk and hip-hop electronic music with free flowing, humorous lyrics. Rebillet distributes his work primarily through YouTube videos and Twitch live streams using a loop station, keyboard, vocals and percussion instruments to produce his songs in his apartment. He has released three studio albums (Marc Rebillet, Europe and Loop Daddy III) and two extended play records (Loop Daddy and Loop Daddy II).

Early life 
Rebillet's father was French and his mother is from South Carolina. His parents met in Paris. Rebillet started playing piano at age four; he studied classical music until age 15 while attending Booker T. Washington High School for the Performing and Visual Arts in Dallas.

In 2007, Rebillet first went viral after being interviewed on Fox 4 in Dallas while lining up to be the first to buy an iPhone during its initial release. A woman paid Rebillet $800 for his spot in the front of the line, attempting to buy many phones to resell. The plan backfired because the store's policy only allowed one iPhone sale per customer. The video of the encounter received four million views.

Rebillet dropped out of Southern Methodist University after studying acting for a year. During the next decade, Rebillet worked as a server, an executive assistant, and in a corporate call center while producing music under the name "Leae". Rebillet moved to New York City in 2011 and back to Dallas in 2014 to care for his father, who had Alzheimer's disease.

In 2016, Rebillet claimed on Reddit to have discovered an alleged unreleased 1998 Sufjan Stevens album in a dumpster outside record label Asthmatic Kitty's studios in Dumbo, Brooklyn in 2014. A representative from the label who responded to the post was unable to confirm the album's authenticity, but requested that Rebillet not share it. A few hours later, Rebillet proceeded to upload the album and share it on 4chan. In an interview with Stereogum the next day, he expressed regret for disrespecting the label's wishes, but stated he wanted to let the album be preserved online. When asked if the album was possibly a hoax, Rebillet responded, "I have neither the time nor the desire to prove its authenticity."

Career

Online streaming 

Rebillet's professional music career began in 2016, when he began publishing YouTube videos and live streams of himself improvising songs in his bedroom, apartment, and hotel rooms, often while dancing in his boxer briefs. These videos began to go viral through Reddit and Facebook, generating a fan base, and earning Rebillet tips. Many of Rebillet's songs are inspired by live requests from his fans, who call him on a phone number that he posts on social media, or comment during the live stream. Rebillet's sessions can last from one to five hours. The content of the streams varies widely, from romance and sex to more frivolous topics, such as snacking.

During the COVID-19 pandemic, Rebillet's tour of Australia and New Zealand was cancelled and subsequently rescheduled for early 2021. In place of the cancelled shows, he scheduled four free live stream shows on Twitch named for four cities on the cancelled tour. He called this collection of shows the "Quarantine Livestream Tour", with the first show attracting over 1.57 million viewers and raising over $34,000 for coronavirus-related charity. Explaining why he chose to begin streaming on Twitch, Rebillet told The Verge, "I’m just trying to survive, and Twitch has the highest earning potential for livestreams."

Also related to the pandemic, Rebillet recorded a song, called "Essential Workers Anthem", dedicated to essential workers, to thank them for their work. Discussing the song for the Boston Herald, Jed Gottlieb wrote that "the tune he built in a minute had more moxie and magic than anything on the recent lo-fi network TV concerts".

On December 9 2020, in anticipation of hitting one million YouTube subscribers, Rebillet streamed live during and after hitting the milestone. He used the stream as an opportunity to donate to multiple charities.

Rebillet has performed streams with Erykah Badu, Reggie Watts, Emily King, DJ Premier, Brady Watt, Flying Lotus, Madison McFerrin, Harry Mack, and Wayne Brady.

In June 2021, Rebillet starred in a television commercial for German supermarket chain Edeka. The lighthearted commercial shows him creating music in the market by playing the produce and food products as musical instruments.

As of August 2021, Rebillet has 11.8 million online streams of his music, more than 2 million YouTube subscribers, and over 127 million YouTube views.

Rebillet was the host of a biweekly series "We've Got Company" that streamed on Twitch in early 2022, featuring Rebillet along with musical guests. Guests during the first season included Wyclef Jean, Tokimonsta, Alison Wonderland, Reggie Watts and Tenacious D.

Live performances 

His first live shows took place in 2017 in bars in his native Dallas, Texas. He subsequently moved to New York to further develop his music career. Describing how his online presence quickly increased his fanbase, Rebillet told an interviewer:It happened very, very quickly...the whole online thing just took off in this very aggressive way. Like, people around the world just started sharing my stuff on Facebook primarily, and my audience on Facebook went from 7,000 or 10,000 followers to, within a week or two, 50,000. Then it was 100,000. And it just kept climbing! And with that spike came all of these booking requests from all over the world that I really had no clue how to deal with or what to do with.

Starting in 2019, Rebillet has performed on tours in the United States and Europe, and ticket sales have become his primary source of revenue. Rebillet's live shows are energetic, interactive, and almost entirely improvised, with very little material being repeated from show to show. Explaining his approach to performance, Rebillet said, "I think up a couple of ideas, make some observations through the day, think of something that’s germane to the crowd I’m playing to, I use those things as seedlings for song ideas." The Dublin Gazette called Rebillet "a man who’s thoughtful far beyond his output. A considered artist, having fun." The Irish Examiner called Rebillet a "DJ/comedian/one-person emotional meltdown" and called his live performance "unnerving and very engaging". Tyler Hicks of the Dallas Observer said that "few performers can match the zealous intensity".

In 2021, Rebillet embarked on the "Third Dose" tour, which included major American music festivals, such as Bonnaroo, Austin City Limits Music Festival and Lollapalooza.

Drive-In Concert Tour 
In response to the COVID-19 pandemic in 2020, in which all concerts were cancelled, Rebillet scheduled a "drive-in concert tour" in June 2020, in which he performed at twelve shows at eight drive-in theaters in the United States while attendees watch from their cars and listen over a local radio frequency. The objective of these performances was to remain in compliance with social distancing regulations. In place of opening acts, short films were shown. Explaining how he planned to perform, Rebillet told CNN, "Since everyone is going to be forced to be in their cars, I'll be able to do a lot of running around, 'interacting' with the audience, just by doing my thing." The tour was called the first of its kind in the United States, and was generally sold-out, grossing $523,000 with 12,132 attendees. Rebillet reached more fans on the drive-in tour than he would have on a comparable tour of indoor venues.

Awards and recognition 
In August 2019, Billboard named Rebillet as a "Billboard Dance Emerging Artist", writing that Rebillet creates "sexy hooks", "sensual R&B burners", and "hip-hop-tinged funk creations".

In December 2019, Shacknews awarded Rebillet the "Do it for Shacknews Award 2019", saying that he rose to a "surprising level of Internet notoriety" in 2019. Shacknews CEO Asif Khan wrote: "The popularity of his very experimental style to creating music is inspiring to the countless part-time studio musicians who are out there on the Internet. Marc's ability to build a community has  to pockets of cheerleaders appearing all over the place these days."

In 2020, Clubbing TV named Rebillet No. 2 on its list of the top 40 live streaming DJs, saying, "No one can make you laugh and dance like Marc Rebillet."

Music 
Rebillet's music is defined by his use of a Boss RC-505 loop station, which allows him to layer his voice with keyboards, tambourines, and other hand percussion instruments. Most of his songs are improvised, and include elements of funk, soul, hip hop, and house music, as well as comedy skits. Nick Pagano described Rebillet's music as ranging "from soulful serenading piano ballads to funky bass licks to downright club bangers, and is always accompanied by his unique sense of humor". His lyrics tend to be comical, silly, or vulgar, enough so that he has been referred to as a comedian. Rebillet's "goofy", "nerdy", and "earnest" personality plays a role in his popularity.

Speaking about the lyrical content of Rebillet's songs, WBUR's Tonya Mosley said, "they’re actually really insightful. It’s sort of like social commentary."

Rebillet has mentioned Reggie Watts, Nina Simone, Madlib, and James Blake as sources of inspiration. Speaking about Reggie Watts, Rebillet has said, "I would not be doing this if he didn’t exist."

Media 
In 2021, Architectural Digest published a feature on Rebillet's apartment in Lower Manhattan. Carly Olson praised Rebillet's style and "killer eye for design", writing that his "light and airy two-bedroom apartment in Lower Manhattan is clean and pristine, featuring statement art, vintage finds, and even a couple trophy pieces that’ll give true furniture nerds hearts in their eyes." The apartment contains furniture by Ligne Roset and Pierre Paulin, and art by Verner Panton and Jack Youngerman.

On September 10, 2021, Rebillet threw out the ceremonial first pitch in a Major League Baseball game in St. Louis, Missouri between the St. Louis Cardinals and the Cincinnati Reds.

Discography

Solo albums
 Marc Rebillet (2018)
 Europe (2019)
 Loop Daddy III (2020)

Extended plays
 Loop Daddy (2018)
 Loop Daddy II (2019)

Singles
 Funk Emergency (2019)
 One More Time (2019)
 You Were There (2019)
 Work That Ass For Daddy (2019)
Vaccinated Attitude (2021)

As Leae
 Pod 314 (with USooME) (2012)
 Rattlebrain EP (2013)
 week | ep (2013)

Filmography

References

External links 

 
 

1988 births
American electronic musicians
American experimental musicians
American people of French descent
Living people
Musicians from Dallas
Twitch (service) streamers
YouTubers from Texas